Lucien Weiler (born 3 August 1951 in Ettelbruck) is a Luxembourgian politician and jurist.  He is a member of the Christian Social People's Party, and served as President of the Chamber of Deputies from 3 August 2004 to 7 June 2009.  He was first elected to the Chamber at the 1984 election, representing the Nord circonscription.

Weiler also sat on the communal council of Diekirch (1986 – 1993), during which time, he served as an échevin (1988 – 1993).

Footnotes

External links
 Chamber of Deputies profile

Presidents of the Chamber of Deputies (Luxembourg)
Members of the Chamber of Deputies (Luxembourg) from Nord
Members of the Chamber of Deputies (Luxembourg)
Councillors in Diekirch
Christian Social People's Party politicians
1951 births
Living people
People from Ettelbruck